Smokestack Lightning is the second solo album by Mike Harrison, most notable as a principal lead singer for Spooky Tooth.  The album was released on Island Records in 1972 and was co-produced by Chris Blackwell and Mike Harrison. The album was recorded at the Muscle Shoals Sound Studio in Alabama with the Muscle Shoals Rhythm Section.

Track listing 

"Tears" (Jimmy Stevens) - 4:12  
"Paid My Dues" (Stevens) - 4:19  
"What a Price" (Murphy Maddux, Jack Jessup, Fats Domino) - 5:52  
"Wanna Be Free" (Joe Tex) - 4:14    
"Turning Over" (Harrison, Luther Grosvenor) - 6:31  
"Smokestack Lightning" (Chester Burnett) - 12:28

Personnel 

Mike Harrison - harmonica, vocals    
Pete Carr - guitar   
Jimmy Johnson - guitar    
Wayne Perkins - slide guitar   
Luther Grosvenor - acoustic guitar
Barry Beckett - keyboards   
Clayton Ivey - keyboards
David Hood - bass   
Roger Hawkins - drums
Harrison Calloway - trumpet   
Mike Stacey - trumpet
Harvey Thompson - tenor saxophone   
Ronald Eades - baritone saxophone 
Charles Rose - trombone

Other Credits
Chris Blackwell - Co-producer
Mike Harrison - Co-producer

References 

1972 albums
Island Records albums
Mike Harrison (musician) albums
Albums produced by Chris Blackwell
Albums recorded at Muscle Shoals Sound Studio